Xima Subdistrict is a subdistrict in Rongcheng District, Jieyang, Guangdong, China. , it has 7 residential communities under its administration.

See also 
 List of township-level divisions of Guangdong

References 

Township-level divisions of Guangdong
Jieyang